Max Fleming Crawford was an American writer. He was born in Lubbock, Texas, and grew up in Floydada, Texas. 
Crawford was influenced by Ernest Hemingway, Graham Greene, and Malcolm Lowry. His friendships with other writers were a great influence in his life and career as well, including Larry McMurtry, Wendell Berry, Michael Koepf, Raymond Carver, Chuck Kinder, Al Young, Diane Smith, Bill Kittredge, Scott Turow, Jon Jackson and James Crumley.

Personal life
He attended The University of Texas at Austin where he earned an undergraduate degree in economics and met his wife, Susan Sherzer Parsons. They moved to Mexico and lived in the Zona Rosa of Mexico City, where his son Peter was born. After the birth of his daughter Katherine in Houston, Crawford was awarded a Stegner Fellowship, and moved with his family to California.  Over his life, he worked on his novels in Houston, London, Pézenas, France, Montana, and San Francisco.

Career
Many of his novels are set in West Texas, such as Lords of the Plain, much admired by Ronald Reagan, and The Backslider, and others in California, such as The Bad Communist. He has also published poems and written and edited literary publications, such as The Redneck Review and 100 Flowers.

His papers are held in the Sowell Family Collection in Literature, Community, and the Natural World, part of the Southwest Collection/Special Collections Library at Texas Tech University.

Works
Waltz Across Texas (1975) – novel (first novel published)
The Backslider (1976) – novel (first novel written)
The Bad Communist (1979) – novel
Lords of the Plain (1985) – novel
Six Key Cut (1986) – novel
Icarus (1988) – novel, with Michael Koepf
Can't Dance (1989) – novel
The Red & the White (1996) – novel
Highschoolharry&co. (2000) – novel
Wing Shot:  A Novel (2001)
Wamba:  A Novel (2002)
Eastertown:  A Novel (2003)

Quotes
No one knew when we would commence our second campaign.  Our horses were fat, the men restless, all equipment and tack and supplies stood ready, and still we did not march out.

Lords of the Plain (1997)

In nine days’ march I reached some plains, so vast that I did not find their end anywhere I went … plains with no more landmarks than as if we had been swallowed up in the sea, where our guides strayed about, because there was not a stone, nor a bit of rising ground, nor a tree, nor a shrub, nor anything to go by … 

Lords of the Plain (1997)

References

External links 
 
 
 
 
 
 
 
 
 
 
 
 

1938 births
2010 deaths
People from Lubbock, Texas
American historical novelists
Western (genre) writers
Novelists from Texas
University of Texas at Austin College of Liberal Arts alumni
Stanford University alumni
American male novelists
20th-century American novelists
21st-century American novelists
20th-century American male writers
21st-century American male writers
People from Floydada, Texas